State Center Township is a township in Marshall County, Iowa, USA.

History
State Center Township was created in 1866.

References

Townships in Marshall County, Iowa
Townships in Iowa